Torrance Watkins (born July 30, 1949) is an American equestrian and Olympic champion. Formerly known as Torrance Fleischmann, she won a team gold medal in eventing at the 1984 Summer Olympics in Los Angeles, and finished 4th in the individual contest.

Early years
Watkins is the daughter of August and Torrance Watkins (Sr.); she has three brothers: Richardson, Thornton, and August Jr. Her family was full of horsemen, many of them foxhunters, and she began riding to the hounds at the age of four. She then lived in Peru during her teenage years, and graduated from the University of Denver.

International accomplishments
Watkins made her international debut in the 1970s, and her career spanned into the 1990s. Her two most famous horses include the pinto mare Poltroon, and the ex-racehorse Finvarra. Her accomplishments include:

1978
 World Championships team silver

1979
 USCTA Leading Lady

1980
 USCTA Rider of the Year
 USCTA Leading Lady
 Qualified for the 1980 U.S. Olympic team but did not compete due to the U.S. Olympic Committee's boycott of the 1980 Summer Olympics in Moscow, Russia. She was one of 461 athletes to receive a Congressional Gold Medal instead. 
 Fontainebleau Olympic Games, individual bronze, making her the first woman to win a medal in the sport
 Winner of the Modified Advanced division at the Rolex Kentucky Three Day

1982
 World Championships team bronze

1983
 USCTA Leading Lady

1984
 USCTA Leading Lady
 Los Angeles Olympic Games, team gold, fourth place individually, only US rider to have a double-clear cross-country and stadium round

1985
 USCTA Leading Lady

1986
 Part of the USET World Championships team

2003
 First woman to be inducted into the US Eventing Hall of Fame

Other notable accomplishments
Watkins finished second at the Burghley Horse Trials and fourth at the Badminton Horse Trials. She is a licensed course designer, having designed such courses as the CDCTA 3-Day and Intermediate Horse Trials, and the GMHA Preliminary and Intermediate Horse Trial courses. She also organized the Over the Walls Horse Trials for five years at Great Meadowbrook Farm, which was a CIC*** World Cup qualifier in 2004 and was used as a selection trial for Canadian and U.S. Equestrian Teams for the Olympic and World Equestrian Games.

Personal life
Watkins married Charles Fleischmann in February 1981; she competed under his last name in the 1984 Olympics. In 1988 Watkins lost four of her champion horses, including Curragh and Poltroon in a horrific barn fire. She lost most of her competition ribbons, cups and trophies as well as her 1984 Olympic 3-day event medal.
In June 1995, Watkins and her partner Erik Fleming purchased a  property in Hardwick, Massachusetts, which they named Morningfield Farm. The couple later acquired three adjacent parcels of land. In 1998, they bought a  farm which they called Great Meadowbrook.

Sources
 US Eventing Hall of Fame Inductees

References

1949 births
Living people
American event riders
Equestrians at the 1984 Summer Olympics
American female equestrians
Olympic gold medalists for the United States in equestrian
Medalists at the 1984 Summer Olympics
Congressional Gold Medal recipients
21st-century American women